Omir Guadalupe Fernandez Mosso (born February 8, 1999) is an American professional soccer player who plays as an attacking midfielder for Major League Soccer club New York Red Bulls.

Career

Youth and college 
Fernandez played for the New York Red Bulls Academy and made one appearance for the New York Red Bulls II team in 2016. Fernandez was a three star college recruit by TopDrawer soccer, and the number 26 recruit for the class of 2017 nationwide, and number 2 in New Jersey. He ultimately chose to play for Wake Forest over North Carolina, Virginia, Loyola Maryland, and Columbia. During his freshman year, he was a super-sub playing in 23 matches, but coming off the bench for all matches. He notched six goals and five assists during the 2017 campaign, scoring his first goal against Louisville on September 9, 2017. In his sophomore season, he became a starter playing in 21 matches, and scored 12 goals and 6 assists. During his college years Fernandez also played for the New York Red Bulls U-23 team.

New York Red Bulls 
On January 26, 2019, Fernandez signed his first professional contract with New York Red Bulls. On February 20, 2019, he made his professional and New York Red Bulls debut coming on in the 74th minute for Alex Muyl in 2–0 victory in a 2019 CONCACAF Champions League fixture at Atlético Pantoja. On March 2, 2019, Fernandez made his league debut with the club, appearing as a starter in a 1–1 draw with Columbus Crew on the opening day of the season. On March 12, 2019, Omir scored his first professional goal in a 4–2 defeat to Mexican side Santos Laguna in a CONCACAF Champions League match in Torreon, Mexico. On May 25, 2019, Fernandez scored his first league goal in a 2–0 victory over FC Cincinnati at Nippert Stadium.

On August 29, 2020, Omir scored his first goal of the season in a 1–1 draw with New England Revolution at Gillette Stadium. On October 7, 2020, he scored for New York in a 1–2 loss against Inter Miami FC. Omir scored his first goal of the 2021 season in a 4-0 road victory over 
Inter Miami FC. He continued his good form scoring the winning goal for New York on September 25, 2021, in a 1–0 victory in the Hudson River Derby over rival New York City FC at Yankee Stadium.

On February 26, 2022, Fernandez scored the winning goal for New York in a 3-1 victory over San Jose Earthquakes in the opening match of the season. On June 22, 2022, Fernandez helped New York to advance to the semifinals of the 2022 U.S. Open Cup, scoring a goal in a 3-0 victory over local rival New York  City FC.

Personal life 
Born in the United States to Mexican parents, Fernandez holds a U.S. and Mexican citizenship.

Career statistics

Club

References

External links 
 Omir Fernandez on TopDrawer Soccer
 Omir Fernandez at Wake Forest Athletics
 

1999 births
Living people
All-American men's college soccer players
Sportspeople from the Bronx
Soccer players from New York City
Soccer players from New Jersey
USL Championship players
New York Red Bulls II players
New York Red Bulls U-23 players
Wake Forest Demon Deacons men's soccer players
Association football forwards
New York Red Bulls players
American soccer players
American sportspeople of Mexican descent
Major League Soccer players
Homegrown Players (MLS)